Cornwall and West Plymouth was a European Parliament constituency covering Cornwall and Plymouth in England.  With Somerset and North Devon, it was one of the first two seats to elect a Liberal Democrat Member of the European Parliament.

Prior to its uniform adoption of proportional representation in 1999, the United Kingdom used first-past-the-post for the European elections in England, Scotland and Wales. The European Parliament constituencies used under that system were smaller than the later regional constituencies and only had one Member of the European Parliament each.

The seat consisted of the Westminster Parliament constituencies (on their 1983 boundaries) of Falmouth and Camborne, North Cornwall, Plymouth Devonport, Plymouth Drake, St Ives, South East Cornwall and Truro.

Cornwall and West Plymouth was created in 1994 to replace most of Cornwall and Plymouth.  It became part of the much larger South West England constituency in 1999.

Members of the European Parliament

Results

References

External links

 David Boothroyd's United Kingdom Election Results

European Parliament constituencies in England (1979–1999)
Politics of Cornwall
Politics of Plymouth, Devon
1994 establishments in England
1999 disestablishments in England
Constituencies established in 1994
Constituencies disestablished in 1999